Žihlava is a settlement in the Municipality of Sveti Jurij ob Ščavnici in northeastern Slovenia. It lies in the Ščavnica Valley in the area known as Prlekija. It is part of the traditional region of Styria and is now included in the Mura Statistical Region.

References

External links
Žihlava at Geopedia

Populated places in the Municipality of Sveti Jurij ob Ščavnici